The Supreme Audit Office (abbreviated NIK) is the supreme audit institution and also one of the oldest state institutions in Poland, created under the Second Republic on February 7, 1919, barely 3 months after the restoration of Poland's independence. It was created on the initiative of the Head of State, Józef Piłsudski. Its organisation and functioning are set out in the Constitution of the Republic of Poland and the NIK Act of 23 December 1994. The NIK is subordinate to the Sejm (lower chamber of the Polish Parliament) and it acts in accordance with the principle of collegiate responsibility. The NIK is headed by the President who is appointed by the Sejm for a six-year term of office. The NIK performs audits related to, primarily, the execution of the state budget as well as public finance spending and management of public property by state and local governmental bodies and economic entities. Every year, the NIK submits three key documents to the Sejm: the analysis of the state budget execution and monetary policy guidelines, the opinion on the vote of discharge for the Council of Ministers and the annual report on the NIK’s activity.

From its very first day, NIK has been the country's supreme audit institution, empowered to exercise wide-ranging audit of the revenue and expenditure of the state and all institutions and corporations that make use of public funds. NIK is entitled to audit all state institutions, government and local government administrative units, together with those corporate bodies and non-governmental organisations which perform public contracts or receive government grants and guarantees. 

The Constitution of the Republic of Poland, and the statute relating to the NIK, determine that the Polish SAI functions on the principle of collegiate responsibility. The Speaker of the Parliament appoints members of the College for a three-year tenure. The tasks of the College include the approval of the analysis of the state budget execution and the principles of fiscal policy, the audit of the NIK’s performance, formulating an opinion concerning certification of performance of duties part of discharge procedure of the government, the work plan and the draft budget for the NIK. The College assesses audit programmes and the outcomes of particularly important audits. It also considers post audit objections.

Under the current regulations, NIK is answerable to the Sejm, which appoints its President for a 6-year term, with the approval of the Senate. Terms of office of the President of the NIK do not necessarily coincide with those of the Parliament, which in practice prevents this office from being dependent on any political party. Like members of the Sejm, the President of NIK also enjoys immunity: he cannot be arrested or indicted without the consent of the Sejm. Currently, the post of the President of the NIK is held by Marian Banaś, appointed on 30 August 2019.

The Supreme Audit Office operates through its Departments and Regional Branches. The division into Departments reflects the scope of the matters it audits, and thus NIK includes the following Departments:

Public Administration
Budget and Finance
Economy, Public Assets and Privatisation
Infrastructure
Audit Methodology and Professional Development
Science, Education and National Heritage
National Defence 
Public Order and Internal Security
Labour, Social Affairs and Family
Legal Affairs
Agriculture and Rural Development
Strategy
Environment 
Health

Other Departments of the NIK:

Facilities and Logistics
IT
Corporate Services
Accounts

The division into Regional Branches is connected with the territorial division of Poland. The number of NIK Regional Branches, 16, equals that of the voivodeships.

NIK institutes audit proceedings on its own initiative, at the request of Sejm or its bodies or representatives (e.g. the Speaker of Sejm), the President of the Republic, or the Prime Minister. Special types of NIK activities include audits of the state budget execution and of the principles of monetary policy, as well as the NIK opinion in votes of confidence for the Council of Ministers.

The NIK fulfils its tasks based on periodic work plans. In the first instance, the audit of the state budget execution is completed, as the NIK is legally bound to conduct this activity. NIK undertakes other audits according to prioritised directions established by the NIK College for a period of three years. The NIK establishes whether the state fulfils its obligations towards its citizens, as well as indicates areas in which there are concerns, in particular ones that could be hindering proper development. Each year new audit areas are selected according to which specific themes for planned audits are programmed. NIK can also undertake ad hoc audits.

The Supreme Audit Office cooperates with similar bodies in the European Union countries, with the European Court of Auditors, International Board of Auditors for NATO, as well as the auditing authorities in other countries of Central and Eastern Europe such as the Czech Republic, Slovakia, Russia, and Hungary.

The Supreme Audit Office also cooperates with its European partners within the framework of EUROSAI - the European Organisation of Supreme Audit Institutions, which is one of seven regional groups of INTOSAI - the International Organisation of Supreme Audit Institutions. Jacek Jezierski, President of the NIK was the Chair of EUROSAI Governing Board in 2008-2011.

President of the NIK

See also

External links

 Official English homepage

References

Government of Poland
Poland
Judiciary of Poland
Supreme audit institutions